The 2019 Mongolian Premier League was the 51st season of football in Mongolia. The season began on 13 April and is scheduled to end in August 2019. This is the second year of a 3-year sponsorship deal with Mazala.

Erchim are the defending champion. Khoromkhon and Khaan Khuns Titem joined as the promoted teams from the 2018 Mongolian 1st League, replacing Arvis and Gepro which were relegated from the 2018 Mongolian Premier League.

Teams

Stadiums and locations

Personnel and kits

League table

See also
2019 MFF Cup

References

External links
Mongolian Football Federation
 Mongorian Premier League summary (SOCCERWAY)

Mongolia Premier League seasons
Mongolia
1